Dierrias J. Humphries, Sr. (born December 19, 1978) is a former American football wide receiver. Undrafted in 2002, Humphries was signed on by the Baltimore Ravens as an undrafted free agent, spending the 2002 NFL season on their roster. He then went on to play for the Arena Football League's Carolina Cobras.

A native of Union, South Carolina, Humphries was a letterman in football and basketball at Union County High School. He then played both sports at Presbyterian College.

His son, D. J. Humphries, is currently an offensive tackle for the Arizona Cardinals.

References 

1978 births
Living people
American football wide receivers
Presbyterian Blue Hose football players
Carolina Cobras players
Columbus Destroyers players